Durmuş Bayram (born March 15, 1986 in Germany) is a professional football defender.

Honours 
 Kayserispor
Turkish Cup (1): 2008

External links
 Guardian Stats Centre

1986 births
Living people
Turkish footballers
Kayserispor footballers
Association football defenders